The Gardens Greyhound & Sporting Complex is an Australian stadium located in Newcastle, New South Wales. The complex is known as Newcastle Greyhounds when it was used as a greyhound racing venue. It was the former home of the Newcastle Breakers, who played in the National Soccer League (NSL) from 1991 until 2000. It was also the home ground of the short-lived Hunter Mariners rugby league team, who participated in the only season of the Super League in 1997. The stadium is currently used by soccer team Wallsend FC.

History
The ground was primarily used for soccer, hosting the Newcastle Breakers during their tenure in the National Soccer League. It was later used by rugby league team Hunter Mariners. Despite redevelopment in 2005 and 2006 which added a greyhound running track, the stadium is still used for soccer and rugby league with Wallsend FC a current tenant.

Naming
The stadium was named Breakers Stadium after the Newcastle Breakers. In the early 1990s it was sponsored by hardware chain Mitre 10 and known as Mitre 10 Stadium. In the mid-1990s, sports manufacturer Topper sponsored both the team and the ground, and was known as Topper Stadium. When the company went into administration, it withdrew its sponsorship, and it reverted to its original name. The stadium became known as The Gardens Greyhound & Sporting Complex and is also referred to as Newcastle Greyhounds.

Structure and facilities
The single stand on the eastern side holds 2,000 general viewing seats with corporate facilities behind. It also has a restaurant/bistro below the stadium and change rooms for the sport teams that play there.

References

External links
 

Sport in Newcastle, New South Wales
Rugby league stadiums in Australia
Soccer venues in New South Wales
Sports venues in New South Wales
Newcastle Breakers FC